The Comrads was American gangsta rap duo from Lynwood, California, composed of Kelly "K-Mac" Garmon and Terrell "Gangsta" Anderson. The pair made a major splash in the Los Angeles area in the summer of 1997 with the single "Homeboyz" from their self-titled debut album. The duo signed with Mack 10's Hoo-Bangin' Records and released their sophomore studio album Wake Up & Ball in 2000.  

After the group split, K-Mac joined Mack 10's supergroup Da Hood to release Mack 10 Presents da Hood in 2002. Gangsta has released his solo album Penitentiary Chances via Heat Rocc Entertainment in 2003.

Discography

Albums

Singles

Guest appearances

References

Hip hop groups from California
American musical duos
Hip hop duos
People from Lynwood, California